Sir John Carter, QC (27 January 1919 – 23 February 2005) was a Guyanese politician, lawyer and diplomat.

Career 

Born in Cane Grove, Demerara, he attended Queens College, Georgetown (then British Guiana)

From 1939 to 1945, during the Second World War, he studied and taught law in London and his legal expertise became invaluable on numerous discrimination cases to the League of Coloured Peoples. In 1944, he became involved in a case of an African-American soldier serving in Britain who had been condemned to death for rape by a US military court. In the end, the sentence was commuted.

In 1945, he returned to British Guiana and established a law practice. To his mandatories belonged Forbes Burnham and Desmond Hoyte. In 1948, he became the youngest member of the colony's legislative council.

In 1952, he founded the United Democratic Party; in 1957 Forbes Burnham convinced him to become the first chairman of the People's National Congress. 

In 1962, he became a Queen's Counsel; he was knighted four years later. On 28 June 1966, he was appointed the first ambassador to Washington, D. C. where he was accredited from 18 July 1966 until 11 July 1970 and was concurrently accredited to the United Nations and was High Commissioner in Ottawa (Canada). From 1970 to 1976, he was High Commissioner in London, and was concurrently accredited in Paris (France), Bonn (West Germany), Moscow (Soviet Union) and Belgrade (Yugoslavia). While he was High Commissioner in London, the government of Forbes Burnham nationalised a sugar company from Booker Group. From 1976 to 1979 he was ambassador in Beijing with accreditation in Tokyo and Pyongyang (North Korea). From 1981 till his retirement in 1983 he was High commissioner (Commonwealth) in Kingston, Jamaica.

In 1983, he settled with his with his second wife, Sara Lou, in Washington, D.C..

References

1919 births
2005 deaths
Guyanese emigrants to the United States
Guyanese knights
20th-century Guyanese lawyers
Guyanese politicians
Guyanese Queen's Counsel
Ambassadors of Guyana to the United States
High Commissioners of Guyana to the United Kingdom
Ambassadors of Guyana to China
High Commissioners of Guyana to Jamaica
Knights Bachelor